Bartholomew William Hogan (January 29, 1901 – March 17, 1983) was a psychiatrist, professor and United States Navy officer. Hogan graduated from Boston College in 1923 and received a M.D. from Tufts University in 1925. In the 1930s, he taught at Georgetown University School of Medicine and at the U.S. Naval Hospital in Annapolis, Maryland. During World War II, he served as a senior medical officer on several ships. He was appointed to the rank of rear admiral in 1952 and became Surgeon General of the United States Navy in 1955. After he retired from the U.S. Navy in 1961, he served as deputy medical director of the American Psychiatric Association until 1971. Rear Admiral Hogan died on March 17, 1983. Hogan is buried in Arlington National Cemetery.

Awards and honors
Hogan received multiple honorary degrees. He received an honorary Doctor of Science from Boston College in 1955, as well as an honorary degree from Tufts University.

The Bartholomew Hogan Award for Outstanding Research Paper Among Navy Psychiatry Residents is awarded annually at the Braceland Seminar, a yearly academic conference held prior to the American Psychiatric Association annual meeting.

References

1901 births
1983 deaths
Military medicine in the United States
Boston College alumni
Tufts University School of Medicine alumni
United States Navy officers
Surgeons General of the United States Navy
Georgetown University Medical Center faculty
Burials at Arlington National Cemetery